Eric Michael Moran (born June 10, 1960) is a former American football offensive tackle in the National Football League (NFL) for the Houston Oilers. He also was a member of the Los Angeles Express in the United States Football League. He played college football at the University of Washington.

Early years
Moran attended Foothill High School, where he played defensive tackle. He accepted a football scholarship from the University of Washington, where he was converted into an offensive tackle. 

As a junior, he was named the starter at right tackle. As a senior, he received second-team All-Pac-10 and All-Pacific Coast honors.

Professional career

Los Angeles Express (USFL)
Moran was selected by the Dallas Cowboys in the 10th round (273rd overall) of the 1983 NFL Draft. He was also selected by the Oakland Invaders in the 16th round (186th overall) of the 1983 USFL Draft. He was traded to the Los Angeles Express of the United States Football League. He was waived on February 16, 1984.

Dallas Cowboys
In 1984, he signed with the Dallas Cowboys. He was tried both at offensive guard and offensive tackle. He was waived on August 27.

Houston Oilers
In 1984, he was signed as a free agent by the Houston Oilers. As a rookie, he appeared in 8 games and started one contest at offensive tackle, in place of an injured Dean Steinkuhler. In 1985, he appeared in 15 games (3 starts). In 1986, he appeared in 14 games (4 starts). He wasn't re-signed after the season.

Personal life
His father Jim Moran and his brother Rich Moran played in the NFL.

References

1960 births
Living people
People from Pleasanton, California
Players of American football from California
Sportspeople from Alameda County, California
American football offensive tackles
Washington Huskies football players
Los Angeles Express players
Houston Oilers players